Matt Kennon is the self-titled debut studio album by American country music singer Matt Kennon. It was released on May 11, 2010 (see 2010 in country music) via BamaJam Records. The album's first single release is "The Call," which was released in November 2009 and peaked at number 33 on the Billboard Hot Country Songs charts. "You Can Still Wear White" and "Too Loud" were also released as singles, though both failed to chart.

Country Weekly reviewer Jessica Phillips gave the album three-and-a-half stars out of five, saying that Kennon showed a "rocker-with-a-cause image" and had a "distinctive voice," but thought that Kennon's singing "overwhelm[ed]" the song "Then There Was You." Bobby Peacock of Roughstock gave it a five-star rating, comparing it to Jeffrey Steele's solo albums in sound, also praising Kennon's "gritty vocals" and the songwriting.

Track listing

Personnel

 Dave Brainard – acoustic guitar
 Jim "Moose" Brown – keyboards, piano
 Perry Coleman – background vocals
 Chad Cromwell – drums
 Shannon Forrest – drums
 Paul Franklin – dobro, steel guitar
 Noah Gordon – background vocals
 Kenny Greenberg – electric guitar
 Tania Hancheroff – background vocals
 Tony Harrell – keyboards, organ, piano
 Aubrey Haynie – fiddle, mandolin
 Wes Hightower – background vocals
 Jimi Jamison – background vocals
 Matt Kennon – lead vocals, background vocals
 Julian King – percussion
 Troy Lancaster – electric guitar
 Pat McGrath – acoustic guitar
 Rob McNelley – electric guitar
 Chip Martin – dobro, acoustic guitar, electric guitar, background vocals
 Brent Mason – acoustic guitar, electric guitar
 Duncan Mullins – bass guitar
 Steve Nathan – keyboards, organ, piano
 Larry Paxton – bass guitar
 Mike Payne – electric guitar
 Scotty Sanders – dobro, steel guitar
 Mark Slaughter – electric guitar, background vocals
 Ilya Toshinsky – electric guitar
 Biff Watson – acoustic guitar
 Craig Young – bass guitar

Chart performance

References

2010 debut albums
Matt Kennon albums
R&J Records albums